Vance DeBar Colvig Jr. (March 9, 1918 – March 4, 1991) was an American actor and writer. He voiced the Chopper bulldog character on The Yogi Bear Show. In the 1980s, he made guest appearances in various films, television series, and music videos.

Career
Colvig began his career as a page at NBC. In the 1940s, he became a writer for such radio shows as Breakfast in Hollywood, Command Performance, and Bride and Groom.

On January 5, 1959, he became the first to portray Bozo the Clown on a franchised Bozo program licensed by Larry Harmon. In the role his father Pinto Colvig first portrayed on Capitol Records in 1946 and KTTV-TV in Los Angeles in 1949, Vance portrayed the whiteface clown Bozo on KTLA-TV in Los Angeles from 1959 to 1964.

His best known cartoon voice is of the bulldog Chopper, Yakky Doodle's best friend and protector on The Yogi Bear Show.

He worked mainly as a popular character actor in numerous performances spanning the 1980s; many roles subtly express his clowning talent. He made guest appearances on TV shows including The Golden Girls, Hill Street Blues, and St. Elsewhere. One of his last film roles is as a bum opposite "Weird Al" Yankovic in the 1989 cult comedy film UHF.  He appeared on a 1990 episode of the TV series Night Court playing a bum.  He enjoyed playing several characters at Knott's Berry Farm amusement park and at trade shows.

He appeared in commercials and music videos. His cameo appearances in music videos include David Lee Roth's 1985 cover of "Just a Gigolo" as a female cleaner, and Gregg Allman's 1987 "I'm No Angel" as a gas station attendant.

He identifies himself by name on the second Negativland album Points (1981). On the track "A Nice Place to Live", his live remote broadcasts from the Los Angeles and Contra Costa county fairs are sampled.

Personal life
Colvig was married to Virginia G. Arslanian until his death in 1991. They had a son, Vance DeBar Colvig III.

Death
Colvig died March 4, 1991, of cancer at his Hollywood Hills home, five days before his 73rd birthday.

Select works

Film and television

The Quick Draw McGraw Show (1959, TV Series) - Narrator / Tombstone Jones (voices)
The Yogi Bear Show (1961, TV Series) - Chopper (voice)
Death Valley Days (1966, TV Series) - Dusty
Fred Flintstone and Friends (1977-1978, TV Series)
For the Love of It (1980, TV Movie) - Old Hippie
American Pop (1981) - Hobo #1
St. Elsewhere (1982-1984, TV Series) - Bum / Mr. Pechar
Three's a Crowd (1985, TV Series) - Wino
The Boys Next Door (1985) - Old Man
Amazing Stories (1985, TV Series) - Vaudevillian #1
My Chauffeur (1986) - Doolittle
Odd Jobs (1986) - Chairman
Barfly (1986) - Alcoholic Man
Yogi's Treasure Hunt (1986-1987, TV Series) - Chopper (voice)
Maid to Order (1987) - Man with Newspaper
Dudes (1987) - Hezekiah
Boys Will Be Boys (1987, TV Series)
Pass the Ammo (1988) - Fritz
Crime Story (1988, TV Series) - Billy Jones
Track 29 (1988) - Me. Ennis
Mortuary Academy (1988) - Uncle Willard
Arizona Heat (1988) - Mr. Gordon
Big Top Pee-wee (1988) - Clownie
All's Fair (1989) - Old Man
Hard Time on Planet Earth (1989, TV Series) - Fan #2
UHF (1989) - Bum
Night Court (1990, TV Series) - Bum
Mother Goose Rock 'n' Rhyme (1990, TV Movie) - Dungeon Warden
The New Adam-12 (1991, TV Series) - Wino
Boris and Natasha: The Movie (1992, TV Movie) - One-Eyed Man (final film role, posthumous release)

Radio
Breakfast in Hollywood (1941–1948) - Writer
Command Performance (1942–1949) - Writer
Bride and Groom (1945–1950) - Writer

References

External links
 

1918 births
1991 deaths
20th-century American male actors
American male film actors
American male television actors
American male voice actors
American radio writers
Deaths from cancer in California
Male actors from Los Angeles
Male actors from San Francisco